Opera Van Java (abbreviated as OVJ) is an improvisation comedy show broadcast on the Indonesian TV station Trans7. The show's concept is of wayang orang performances in a modern setting. As such, all positions are referred as wayang.

The sketches are varied. They may be adapted from Indonesian folklore, biographies of famous persons, fiction, mystery stories, foreign stories, or popular culture.

The name Opera Van Java likely comes as a parody of nickname of several places in Java by the Dutch during Indonesia's colonial times (i.e. Parijs van Java (Paris of Java) for Bandung), hence the name means Opera of Java.

On 15 August 2016, Opera Van Java was revived with the new stars.

Special shows

Sahurnya OVJ
Sahurnya OVJ was a special Ramadan edition of Opera Van Java which began airing in 2009. It was broadcast at dawn, coinciding with suhoor.

Panas Dingin Awards
Starting in 2011, OVJ appeared in different designs, namely Panas DIngin Awards. It is served as the parody of Panasonic Gobel Awards. The reason of this parody is the Trans Corp (the sole owner of Trans7) have felt cheated by MNC (owner of RCTI, the official broadcaster of the real awards for many consecutive years) because it was considered not fair in determining the winners.

Opera Van Java Awards
Beginning on 11 June 2011, OVJ began holding the Opera Van Java Awards, an annual appreciation night for the guest stars who had appeared on Opera Van Java.

OVJ Roadshow
Since 2010, OVJ has held shows in many cities in Indonesia, usually broadcast as OVJ Roadshow. The roadshow is held twice on Saturdays: in the afternoon (recorded for later airing) and at night (live).

Copa Van Indonesia

After the successful of the Copa Indonesia football competition in 2009, in 2010, OVJ appeared in a format which mixed football with comedy in the first time, the Copa Van Indonesia. It was based on the Copa Indonesia, and held every 2 years after the Copa Indonesia season. And, in 2011, OVJ is held the next football competition, but in annual, is OVJ Cup. Also same as Piala Indonesia.

Opera Van Java Cup a.k.a. Copa Van Java

From 11 June to 11 July 2011, as well as 7 July to 7 August 2012, OVJ appeared in a format which mixed football with comedy. It was based on the Indonesian Cup.

OVJ Cup Champions

Achievements
 Panasonic Gobel Awards 2010: Favorite comedy/humour category.
 Panasonic Gobel Awards 2011: Favorite comedy/humour category.
 Panasonic Gobel Awards 2012: Nominated favorite comedy/humour category.
 Panasonic Gobel Awards 2013: Nominated favorite comedy/humour category.

Sponsorships
 Luwak White Koffie
 Sasa
 Thermolyte Plus
 Viostin DS
 Krating Daeng
 Antangin JRG
 Kuku Bima EnerG
 Beng Beng
 Teh Gelas
 Cooling 5
 Sarimi Isi 2
 Tolak Angin
 Samsung Galaxy
 Verizon
 Djarum

References

External links 
  OVJ website
  OVJ discussion on Indowebster
  2010 OVJ Roadshow on Bandung, West Java

Indonesian comedy television series
2000s Indonesian television series
2010s Indonesian television series
2009 Indonesian television series debuts
2014 Indonesian television series endings
Trans7 original programming